Maxwell Nyamupanedengu (born 26 October 1984) is a Zimbabwean footballer who plays as a goalkeeper for Zimbabwe Premier Soccer League side Harare City and the Zimbabwe national team.

Career
Nyamupanedengu has spent his entire career with Harare City.  Internationally, he was first selected by a Zimbabwe team in 2009 by Zimbabwe A for the 2009 African Nations Championship. In 2013, Nyamupanedengu featured three times for the Zimbabwe national team with his first call-up coming for a friendly vs. Botswana. In July, he was selected for the 2013 COSAFA Cup and played in all three matches, which included him scoring an own-goal vs. Malawi, of his nation's campaign which ended in a final defeat to Zambia. He was also selected by Zimbabwe for the 2014 African Nations Championship but didn't play.

Career statistics
.

Honours
Harare City
 Cup of Zimbabwe: 2017

References

1984 births
Living people
Zimbabwean footballers
Association football goalkeepers
Zimbabwe international footballers
Kiglon F.C. players
Dynamos F.C. players
Harare City F.C. players